Glintshake (Russian: ГШ) is a Russian rock band formed in Moscow in 2012, consisting of the vocalist and guitarist Ekaterina Shilonosova, the guitarist Yevgeni Gorbunov, the bass guitarist Yegor Sargsyan and the drummer Alexey Yevlanov.

History

2012–2014 
The founders of the band, Shilonosova and Gorbunov, met in Kazan. In 2011, Shilonosova moved to Moscow, where the band was formed the next year. Glintshake's first EP, Freaky Man, was recorded by Shilonosova and Gorbunov and published to the web in June 2012. In October, a music video was released for the title track, "Freaky Man", starring the artist Alexander Krivoshapkin. The bass guitarist Dmitry Midborn and drummer Vasily Nikitin joined the band in October 2012. Each member had already had experience in other music projects: Shilonosova in MAKE and NV, Gorbunov in NRKTK and Stoned Boys, Midborn in Tesla Boy and On-The-Go, Nikitin in Foojitsu.

The first gig took place in Kazan on 17 November 2012. In March 2013, Glintshake released their second EP, Evil, after which they were invited to several major festivals in Moscow: Bosco Fresh Fest, Afisha Picnic and Faces & Laces. In August 2013, the band opened for The Smashing Pumpkins at Stadium Live in Moscow. In autumn 2013, Midborn left Glintshake and was replaced by Yegor Sargsyan from the band Trud. At the beginning of 2014, drummer Nikitin was replaced by Alexey Yevlanov from The Twiggys.

In May 2014, the band released its first album, Eyebones.

In May 2014, Glintshake released a video for the song "Wiuwiuwiu", which was filmed on an iPhone and edited in a single day. In November, the Nano Banana EP was released, recorded in a new studio near Moscow owned by the Xuman Records label. According to Gorbunov, the EP was "free in terms of style", due to the band moving away from its 1990s music influence. At the end of 2014, Glintshake recorded the song "New Year of Hate" for Afishas New Year's project.

2015 – present 
Early in 2015, Glintshake re-recorded the song "Mu" from the Nano Banana EP in Russian. According to Shilonosova, the original English text had little overlap with the Russian lyrics, but its meaning and general atmosphere were not changed. The re-recorded version of "Мu" and  "New Year of Hate" were released on the deluxe version of Nano Banana in June. In September, a music video for the song "Wrong Anthem" was released, created by the illustrator Alexander Kostenko.

At the same time, the band announced that "good old Glintshake is coming to an end, but new and evil one is starting off". In an interview with the website Furfur, Gorbunov said that the band had decided to withdraw from 1990s alternative rock influence, stop singing in English and make a full turn in work: "…We've got a whole bunch of our own stuff: Zvuki Mu, russian avant-garde." In October, Glintshake released a single from an upcoming album, the song "Без пятнадцати пять" (Bez pyatnadtsati pyat', A quarter to five) along with a music video. In November, "Тени" (Teni, Shadows) was released.

In 2016, the band released an album of songs in Russian called ОЭЩ МАГЗИУ — a cryptic acronym in Russian, which can be transliterated in English as OESCH MAGZIU.

In 2018, Glintshake's cover of the Talking Heads' song, "Psycho Killer", was used in the film Leto.

Band members 

Current members
 Ekaterina Shilonosova – vocal, guitar (2012 – present)
 Yevgeni Gorbunov – guitar (2012 – present)
 Yegor Sargsyan – bass guitar (2013 – present)
 Alexey Yevlanov – drums (2014 – present)

Former members
 Dmitry Midborn – bass guitar (2012–2013)
 Vasily Nikitin – drums (2012–2014)

Discography

Albums 
 2014 – Eyebones
 2016 – ОЭЩ МАГЗИУ
 2018 – Польза
 2020 - Гибкий график

EPs 
 2012 – Freaky Man
 2013 – Evil
 2014 – Dive
 2014 – Nano Banana

References

External links 
 
 Glintshake on Last.fm
 Glintshake on Bandcamp
 

Garage rock groups
Musical groups established in 2012
Musical groups from Moscow
Russian musical groups
Russian rock music groups
2012 establishments in Russia